Che Dalha (born August 1958), also romanized as Che Zala and Qizhala, is a Chinese politician of Tibetan ethnicity who served as Chairman (Governor) of Tibet Autonomous Region between January 2017 and October 2021. Originally from Yunnan province, he served as Communist Party Secretary of the Tibetan capital Lhasa between 2012 and 2017. Since October 2017, he is the member of the Central Committee of the Chinese Communist Party.

Career
Che Dalha was born in Zhongdian County, Yunnan (later renamed Shangri-La). He left school at age 10 to herd animals in his home village. He completed primary school and high school by teaching himself. In 1979, he participated in the civil service examinations of Zhongdian County with good results, and was given a minor post in the Communist Youth League as a rural functionary. In 1983, the 25-year-old Che Dalha became the Communist Youth League Secretary of Zhongdian County. He would progressively ascend the ranks of the Communist Party hierarchy, serving as the Deputy Party Secretary, then Party Secretary of Zhongdian County. 

Between 1994 and 2001, Che Dalha was instrumental in bringing the "Shangri-la" brand to life in Zhongdian County, making the area a major tourist destination. In 2001, the year he was promoted to Governor of the Dêqên Tibetan Autonomous Prefecture, Zhongdian County was officially renamed Shangri-La by directive of the State Council. In 1996 he attended to Yunnan Nationalities University, and graduated in 1998 with a degree in economic management specializing in ethnic minority affairs; he also has a bachelor's degree from the Central Party School in political and legal affairs. In Dêqên, Che Dalha was credited with making the region the "best Tibetan region in China" as documented by Chinese official sources. He was elected a provincial party standing committee member in Yunnan province in 2010, ascending to sub-provincial ranks. 

In September 2010, Che Dalha was appointed as the Head of the United Front Work Department in Tibet Autonomous Region, and he was elected as the Vice Chairman of the Tibet People's Political Consultative Conference in 2011. In 2012, he was appointed as the Party Secretary of Tibetan capital Lhasa; the move was welcomed by some Lhasa residents because Che Dalha had replaced a Han Chinese, Qin Yizhi, in the post. In his capacity as party chief of Lhasa, he visited Chicago and met with U.S. Senator Mark Kirk. His tenure in Lhasa was largely defined by the modernization of the cityscape.

On 15 January 2017, Che Dalha was appointed Chairman of Tibet Autonomous Region, succeeding Losang Jamcan. He was the ninth ethnic Tibetan to assume the post after the conclusion of the Cultural Revolution, and the first Chairman from Yunnan province. He was additionally the first Chairman of the region to have not been born in the Tibet Autonomous Region in some twenty years.

On 23 October 2021, he was appointed vice chairperson of the National People's Congress Ethnic Affairs Committee.

References 

Living people
1958 births
Chinese Communist Party politicians from Yunnan
People's Republic of China politicians from Yunnan
Political office-holders in Tibet
Political office-holders in Yunnan
Members of the 19th Central Committee of the Chinese Communist Party
Delegates to the 10th National People's Congress